Durban Harbour's John Milne of 1879 was a South African steam locomotive from the pre-Union era in the Colony of Natal.

In 1879, the Harbour Board of Natal placed a single  saddle-tank locomotive in service, its first own locomotive for shunting work on the docks.

Harbour Board of Natal
A board of commissioners, known as the Harbour Board of Natal, was established by the government of the Colony of Natal at the port of Durban in 1877. It consisted of seven members, the Colonial Engineer, the Collector of Customs, the Port Captain, the Mayor of Durban, two nominees from the Durban Chamber of Commerce and one member appointed by the Natal Government. As in the Cape of Good Hope, the board was responsible for the continuous development of the harbour to be able to accommodate the ever-increasing size and number of ships calling at the port.

Railway operations in the harbour became the responsibility of the Harbours Department of the Government of Natal.

Manufacturer
It would appear that, until 1879, the Natal Government Railways (NGR) provided all the locomotive power for harbour working. The Harbour Board acquired its first own locomotive for shunting work on the docks in 1879. It was a 0-6-0ST saddle-tank engine which had been ordered from Hunslet Engine Company in Leeds and was named John Milne, after the first engineer who had been appointed in 1851 to remove the sand-bar at the entrance to Durban Harbour.

Service
It is not known whether the engine John Milne had been scrapped or sold by 1912, but it was no longer in service when the South African Railways (SAR) renumbering and classification was implemented in 1912, since it does not appear in the classification and renumbering lists which were issued by the SAR Chief Mechanical Engineer in January 1912.

References

0530
0530
0-6-0 locomotives
1879 in South Africa
C locomotives
Cape gauge railway locomotives
Hunslet locomotives
Railway locomotives introduced in 1879
Scrapped locomotives